Cadwaladr, Cadwalader or Cadwallader (with other variant spellings) is a given name and surname of Welsh origin meaning "battle-leader". It was most notably held by Cadwaladr, a seventh-century king of Gwynedd, who was the last Welsh king to claim lordship over all of Britain.

Pronunciation
The name is pronounced  in Welsh and typically  in English.

People with the given name

Cadwaladr ap Cadwallon (633–682), king of Gwynedd
Cadwaladr ap Gruffydd (c. 1096–1172), third son of Gruffydd ap Cynan, king of Gwynedd
Cadwaladr ap Rhys Trefnant (fl. 1600), Welsh poet
Cadwaladr Cesail (fl. 1620), Welsh poet
Cadwaladr Bryner Jones (1872–1954), Welsh agriculturalist

People with the surname or patronymic

Betsi Cadwaladr (1789–1860), Welsh nurse
Cadfan ap Cadwaladr (c. 1140 – c. 1215), Lord of Ceredigion (son of Cadwaladr ap Gruffydd)
Dafydd Cadwaladr (1752–1834), Welsh Calvinistic Methodist preacher
Dilys Cadwaladr (1902–1979), Welsh poet
Edward Cadwaladr, 16th-century Welsh poet
Ellis Cadwaladr (fl. 1707–1740), Welsh poet
Huw Cadwaladr, 17th-century Welsh poet
Llewellyn Cadwaladr (1857–1909), Welsh operatic tenor
Rhys Cadwaladr (fl. 1666–1690), Welsh poet
Carole Cadwalladr, British journalist

People with the surname in variant spellings
This section lists people whose surname is a variant spelling of Cadwaladr other than Cadwalader and Cadwallader, which have their own dedicated pages.
Roger Cadwallador (1568–1610), English beatified Roman Catholic priest and martyr
Carole Cadwalladr (born 1969), author and journalist

See also
Cadwaladr
Cadwalader (disambiguation)
Cadwallader (name)
Cadwallader (disambiguation)
Betsi Cadwaladr University Health Board
Cædwalla of Wessex
Algernon Cadwallader

Welsh masculine given names
Welsh-language surnames
Surnames of Welsh origin